Hong Kong competed at the 2011 World Aquatics Championships in Shanghai, China between July 16 and 31, 2011.

Diving

Hong Kong has qualified 4 athletes in diving.

Men

Women

Open water swimming

Men

Women

Mixed

Swimming

Hong Kong qualified 4 swimmers.

Men

Women

Synchronised swimming

Hong Kong has qualified 11 athletes in synchronized swimming.

Women

Reserve
Him Nga Lam

References

Nations at the 2011 World Aquatics Championships
World Aquatics Championships
Hong Kong at the World Aquatics Championships